Only is an unincorporated community in Hickman County, Tennessee, United States. Only has a post office, with ZIP code 37140.

History
The origin of the place name Only is obscure. Some state its name is derived from the  family of pioneer settlers, while others believe the name refers to a store owner who was always heard to describe his prices as "only five cents", etc.

References

Unincorporated communities in Hickman County, Tennessee
Unincorporated communities in Tennessee